Rudsar (also known as, Roodsar, Rūdsar and Rūd-i-Sar) is a city and capital of Rudsar County, Gilan Province, Iran.

At the 2006 census, its population was 33,321, in 9,741 families.

Geography
Rudsar is located on the Caspian Sea

It is located on a verdant coastal plain with a moderate climate,  from Tehran.  
 
Ghassem Abad is a village near Rudsar.

Climate
Rudsar has a humid subtropical climate (Köppen: Cfa, Trewartha: Cf), with warm, humid summers and cool, damp winters.

Economy
The economy of the city is based on fishing and agriculture. The major products of Roudsar are rice, tea, citrus fruits, and silk.

Name
The word Rudsar comes from the word Rud, the Persian word for river, and sar, the Persian word for head, since Rudsar has rivers running along each side of the city.

According to valid historical documents, the ancient name of Roodsar was "Koutum", which was a small city in Rankooh. The other name of Roodsar was "Hoosem" that had a thriving bazaar and big mosque in the year 375 AH. Later on this city was ruined due to unknown reasons, and was reconstructed by Seyed Reza Kiya during the years 789-831 AH.

It was occupied by Russian forces along with the rest of northern Iran in the early 1900s.

References

External links 

Tourism Info

Cities in Gilan Province

Populated coastal places in Iran
Populated places on the Caspian Sea